Loop 20, also known as the Bob Bullock Loop and Cuatro Vientos Road, is a highway loop that runs to the north and east of the city of Laredo, Texas. Loop 20 extends from the World Trade International Bridge at its northern point to Mangana-Hein Road at its southern point.  The current route varies in construction from a 2-lane road (at its southernmost end) to a freeway with frontage roads (near the World Trade Bridge).

In recent years, much of Laredo's growth has been along Loop 20, with the construction of a new passenger terminal at Laredo International Airport, the Sames Auto Arena, the Uni-Trade Stadium, the new campus of Texas A&M International University, and Doctors Hospital being the most prominent projects.

History
Loop 20 was designated on September 26, 1939 from US 96 (later US 59, and now SH 359) to US 83 in Laredo as a renumbering of SH 12 Loop. On September 27, 1985, Loop 20 was extended from SH 359 to US 59. On August 29, 1996, it extended north to FM 3464 2 miles east of I-35. On May 28, 1998, Loop 20 was extended west and southwest to the Mexico border, concurrent with part of FM 3464. On May 29, 2008, Loop 20 was to be rerouted south of SH 359 to US 83, with the old route (the original portion) to become Texas State Highway Spur 260. The section from SH 359 to Mangana-Hein Road opened in 2011, and as a result, the old route was officially signed as Spur 260. On August 29, 2013, a shortcut opened south of SH 359, with the old route becoming Texas State Highway Spur 259. On February 27, 2014 the section from the entrance to the World Trade Bridge (0.6 miles west of FM 1472) to the intersection with US 59 was redesignated as US 59, but on July 31, 2014 the Loop 20 designation was restored on this section as a concurrency with US 59.

Future expansion

The Texas Department of Transportation's Laredo District is preparing for future growth with plans to upgrade Loop 20 into a freeway by building overpasses at major intersections and constructing frontage roads.  A short freeway section, which is co-signed with both Interstate 69W and U.S. Highway 59, currently exists from the World Trade International Bridge east to Interstate 35 and TxDOT recently constructed a diamond interchange at Loop 20's intersection with U.S. Highway 59 in eastern Laredo; the stack interchange with Interstate 35, locally known as the Milo Interchange, is partially complete.  As of 2008, TxDOT planned to complete interchanges and overpasses at all of Loop 20's major intersections within the next ten years.

As of 2011, TxDOT is currently constructing an interchange at State Highway 359.  An additional interchange at Clark Boulevard, Texas State Highway Spur 400, has been announced by the City of Laredo.

The Cuatro Vientos Road portion of the route is designed for future expansion to a freeway throughout, as well as an extension to the south to U.S. 83 in the vicinity of Rio Bravo, possibly connecting to a future international bridge.

Previous routes
The northwest section of Loop 20 west of I-35 to Farm to Market Road 1472 was originally part of Farm to Market Road 3464, a  road designated on October 26, 1983 to connect I-35 to FM 1472 in northern Laredo, Texas. On April 1, 1988, the route was extended east  over FM 3488, which was cancelled. On June 27, 1995, FM 3464 became Urban Road 3464. On June 29, 2000, FM 3464 was cancelled, as the section west of I-35 was removed from the state highway system, and the section east of I-35 was already part of Loop 20.

Junction list

Notes

References

020
Transportation in Webb County, Texas
Highways in Laredo, Texas